Persea meyeniana is an evergreen tree or shrub in the laurel family (Lauraceae), native to central Chile. It belongs to the genus Persea, a group of evergreen trees that includes the avocado. It is threatened by habitat loss.

Overview
This species is found in some forests of central Chile that face threats of destruction or deforestation; for example, P. meyeniana, occurs on Cerro La Campana, where historic and ongoing deforestation has reduced the habitat of the endangered Chilean wine palm and the forest system as a whole.

References
André Joseph Guillaume Henri Kostermans. 1993. Mutisiopersea Kostermans, a new genus in Lauraceae. Rheedea 3: 132–135.
 C. Michael Hogan. 2008. Chilean Wine Palm: Jubaea chilensis, GlobalTwitcher.com, ed. N. Stromberg

Line notes

Flora of Chile
meyeniana
Plants described in 1833